Doug Smith is an American former college baseball coach who retired after the 2014 season. He had been coaching the UC Riverside Highlanders baseball team.  He held that position since the 2005 season.  Smith was the second coach to lead the Highlanders since their transition to Division I in 2001 and fourth since the establishment of the program in 1958.

Playing career
Smith was a standout catcher at UC Riverside, and was named to the all-conference first team in his senior season of 1975.

Coaching career
Following his playing career, Smith completed a master's degree at California State Polytechnic University, Pomona and served as a part-time assistant coach with the Broncos baseball team for four years.  He then pursued a private business venture for three years before returning to his alma mater as an assistant coach in 1983.  He rose to the head coaching position in 2005.  In his time on the staff at UC Riverside, Smith has coached 34 All-Americans and over 150 players that signed professional contracts.  As head coach, the Highlanders won their first Big West Conference title and made their first NCAA Tournament appearances at the Division I level.  Smith was an assistant for eight Highlander appearances in the Division II NCAA Tournament.  After struggling through a difficult 2012 season, the Highlanders signed a class of eight players who will begin play in 2014, including six pitchers.

Head coaching record
The following table shows Smith's head coaching record.

References

Living people
UC Riverside Highlanders baseball players
Cal Poly Pomona Broncos baseball coaches
California State Polytechnic University, Pomona alumni
UC Riverside Highlanders baseball coaches
Year of birth missing (living people)
Place of birth missing (living people)